Tajareh (also Romanized as Tejrah) is a village in Golab Rural District, Barzok District, Kashan County, Isfahan Province, Iran. At the 2006 census, its population was 258, in 82 families.

References 

Populated places in Kashan County